Regine is the first studio album by Filipino singer-actress Regine Velasquez, released in 1987 by Viva Records in the Philippines in LP, cassette and CD format and later released on 2002 in digital download. The album was produced by Ronnie Henares, also her manager then. It was composed of original Filipino compositions by Christine Bendebel, Vehnee Saturno and OPM 1980s singer-composer Keno among others, except for "Ebb Tide" originally by Frank Chacksfield & His Orchestra composed by Robert Maxwell and Carl Sigman. The carrier single released is "Kung Maibabalik Ko Lang" together with "Maybe Now, Maybe Then".

Background
Regine is Velasquez's first full studio album released after winning champion at RPN 9's Ang Bagong Kampeon singing competition. Although she recorded a song before the album titled "Love Me Again" released through OctoArts, but with her name "Chona Velasquez". However, in 1986, after performing in Martin Nievera's late night TV program "The Penthouse Live!" aired over GMA Radio Television Arts, Nievera suggested that she use her own name which is "Regine" than her nickname. It was then that under new management with Ronnie Henares got her a recording contract to Viva Records owned by Mr. Vic del Rosario. All of the songs in the album were produced by Ronnie Henares. The song "Isang Lahi" was earlier used in the film Gabi Na, Kumander. "Kung Maibabalik Ko Lang" is also used as the theme song of the 1989 movie of the same title starring Maricel Soriano (under Regal Films) and later turned into a Friday segment of Teysi ng Tahanan, which aired by ABS-CBN from 1991 to 1997 hosted by Tessie Tomas.

Track listing

References

See also
 Regine Velasquez discography
 List of best-selling albums in the Philippines

Regine Velasquez albums
1987 debut albums